Afro-American Press and Its Editors is a book published in 1891 written by Irvine Garland Penn. Penn covers African-American newspapers and magazines published between 1827 and 1891. The book covers many aspects of journalism, and devotes a chapter to black female journalists.

About 

Penn believed that the black press played a crucial role in presenting the case to the broader American population that black people were fit for the full benefits of citizenship.

The book is frequently referenced as an important early work on African-American journalism. John Ernest called Penn's book comprehensive and detailed and the foundation of many later studies. Penn wrote in part to encourage blacks to support black papers. Charles A. Simmons writes that Penn's book along with Armistead S. Prides, A Register and History of Negro Newspapers in the United States: 1827–1950 and Warren Brown's Check List of Negro Newspapers in the United States (1827-1946) are essential starting points for understanding the early history of African American newspapers.

List of individuals profiled in book

John Q. Adams (journalist)
A. E. P. Albert
G. W. Anderson
W. H. Anderson (journalist)
William H. Anderson (journalist)
J. T. Bailey
S. J. Bampfield
R. C. O. Benjamin
Daniel S. Bentley
Joseph A. Booker
J. Dallas Bowser
Mary E. Britton
William F. Brooks
Calvin S. Brown
John Edward Bruce
William Buford (journalist)
Abel P. Caldwell
David C. Carter
William Calvin Chase
Levi E. Christy
M. W. Clair
George W. Clinton (journalist)
T. W. Coffee
Lucretia Newman Coleman
Edward E. Cooper
John Wesley Cromwell
John C. Dancy
D. W. Davis (journalist)
Georgia Mabel De Baptiste
Richard DeBaptiste
William H. Dewey
Henry Fitzbutler
Timothy Thomas Fortune
W. H. Franklin
George W. Gayles
C. B. W. Gordon
F. M. Hamilton
Frances E. W. Harper
B. T. Harvey
Charles Hendley
Thomas T. Henry
S. N. Hill
Augustus M. Hodges
J. Alexander Holmes
J. E. Jones (journalist)
R. A. Jones (journalist)
Amelia E. Johnson
W. B. Johnson (journalist)
William E. King
Lillian A. Lewis
M. M. Lewey
E. H. Lipscombe
R. D. Littlejohn
William S. Lowry
Victoria Earle Matthews
Alice E. McEwen
A. N. McEwen
John Mitchell Jr.
W. H. Mixon
J. T. Morris
Gertrude Bustill Mossell
William Murrell (journalist)
Richard Nelson (journalist)
Mary Virginia Cook Parrish
E. W. S Peck
Benjamin B. Pelham
Meta E. Pelham
Robert Pelham Jr.
Christopher J. Perry
R. S. Ransom
I. Randall Reid
Magnus L. Robinson
S. D. Russell
D. J. Saunders
William F. Simpson
H. C. Smith
Lucy Wilmot Smith
W. C. Smith (journalist)
Lavinia B. Sneed
James J. Spellman
John Gordon Street
W. H. Stowers
Elizabeth Stumm
Chasteen C. Stumm
W. Allison Sweeney
C. H. J. Taylor
Marshall W. Taylor (minister)
Robert T. Teamoh
 A. L. Tilghman
Katherine D. Tillman
William B. Townsend
Henry McNeal Turner
S. B. Turner
Josephine T. Washington
John L. Waller
Ida B. Wells
William J. White (journalist)
Daniel Barclay Williams
E. A. Williams
D. A. Williamson
J. H. Williamson
J. T. Wilson
Ione E. Wood

List of newspapers and magazines profiled in book

Freedom's Journal (1827-1829)
The Rights of All (1829-1830)
The Colored American (New York City) (initially the Weekly Advocate) (1837-1842)
The North Star (anti-slavery newspaper) (1847-1865)

References

External links

Edition at archive.org
 via Google Books

1891 non-fiction books
Books about African-American history
Lists of African-American people
United States biographical dictionaries